This article is a compilation of FK Rossiyanka results at UEFA international women's football competitions. As of the beginning of 2017 the team held  a 27 - 7 - 14 record with a goal average of 141 - 56 in the UEFA Women's Cup and the UEFA Women's Champions League, and it had reached the competition's quarter-finals in three occasions.

2006-07 UEFA Women's Cup

Preliminary stage

First stage

2007-08 UEFA Women's Cup

Preliminary stage

First stage

Quarter-finals

2009-10 UEFA Women's Champions League

Preliminary stage

Round of 32

Round of 16

2010-11 UEFA Women's Champions League

Preliminary stage

Round of 32

Round of 16

2011-12 UEFA Women's Champions League

Round of 32

Round of 16

Quarter-finals

2012-13 UEFA Women's Champions League

Round of 32

Round of 16

Quarter-finals

2013-14 UEFA Women's Champions League

Round of 32

Round of 16

2016-17 UEFA Women's Champions League

Round of 32

Round of 16

References

European football
Rossiyanka